Beatrice Deer (born 1985) is a Canadian Inuk singer born in Quaqtaq, Nunavik, Quebec in 1985. She released her debut album, Just Bea, in 2005, and won a Canadian Aboriginal Music Award for Best Inuit/Cultural Album. In 2010, she released her self-titled album, Beatrice Deer, and later that same year, she released a Christmas album, An Arctic Christmas.

Biography
Deer is of Inuk descent and was born in Quaqtaq. She is the cousin of Jaaji of the band Twin Flames.

Beatrice Deer performs throughout the north with her band.

Awards 

 Best Inuit/Cultural Album at the Canadian Aboriginal Music Award
 2021: laureate at the Canadian Indigenous Music Awards.

She was a Felix Award nominee for Indigenous Artist of the Year at the 44th Félix Awards in 2022.

Discography
Just Bea (2005)

Beatrice Deer (2010)

 Fox  (2015)

 My All To You  (2018)

References

Living people
Inuit musicians
Canadian Inuit women
Musicians from Quebec
People from Nunavik
Inuit from Quebec
Canadian Folk Music Award winners
21st-century Canadian women singers
1985 births